Lagery is a commune in the Marne department in north-eastern France.

Pope Urban II was born in the Château de Lagery in 1042.

See also
Communes of the Marne department

References

Communes of Marne (department)